The Neftchi Baku 2014–15 season was Neftchi Baku's 23rd Azerbaijan Premier League season. They started the season under manager Boyukagha Hajiyev, but he was replaced by Arif Asadov in September 2014. Neftchi finished 4th in the Azerbaijan Premier League, runners up in the 2014–15 Azerbaijan Cup, and reached the Play-off round of the 2014–15 UEFA Europa League.

Squad 

(captain)

Out on loan

Reserve squad

Transfers

Summer

In:

Out:

Winter

In:

Out:

The board of directors

Coaching staff

Friendlies

Competitions

Azerbaijan Supercup

Azerbaijan Premier League

Results summary

Results

League table

Azerbaijan Cup

Final

UEFA Europa League

Qualifying rounds

Squad statistics

Appearances and goals

|-
|colspan="14"|Players away from Neftchi Baku on loan:

|-
|colspan="14"|Players who appeared for Neftchi Baku no longer at the club:

|}

Goal scorers

Disciplinary record

Notes
Qarabağ have played their home games at the Tofiq Bahramov Stadium since 1993 due to the ongoing situation in Quzanlı.
Araz-Naxçıvan were excluded from the Azerbaijan Premier League on 17 November 2014, with all their results being annulled.

References

Neftchi Baku
Neftchi Baku
Neftçi PFK seasons